Maciej Kowalczyk (born 6 March 1977 in Wrocław) is a retired Polish footballer who played as a forward.

Career

Club
Kowalczyk came to Lechia Gdańsk from Korona Kielce.

In June 2011, he joined Kolejarz Stróże.

References

External links
 
 

1977 births
Living people
Sportspeople from Wrocław
Association football forwards
Polish footballers
Polish expatriate footballers
Ceramika Opoczno players
Śląsk Wrocław players
FC Arsenal Kyiv players
Korona Kielce players
Sandecja Nowy Sącz players
Kolejarz Stróże players
Widzew Łódź players
Lechia Gdańsk players
Olimpia Grudziądz players
GKS Tychy players
MKS Kluczbork players
Ekstraklasa players
I liga players
IV liga players
Ukrainian Premier League players
Expatriate footballers in Ukraine
Polish expatriate sportspeople in Ukraine